is a 2014 Japanese media project produced by Tatsunoko Production and Avex Pictures in cooperation with Takara Tomy and Syn Sophia. The series is part of the Pretty Rhythm franchise and its fourth animated series, focusing on a group of Japanese idols known as "Prism Stars" that combine song and dance with fashion and figure skating.

Pretty Rhythm: All Star Selection is a compilation series of the previous three animated series, Pretty Rhythm: Aurora Dream, Pretty Rhythm: Dear My Future, and Pretty Rhythm: Rainbow Live. The series introduces Laala Manaka, the main character of Pretty Rhythm'''s spin-off franchise PriPara. The media project consists of a tie-in arcade game titled Pretty Rhythm: All-Star Legend Coord Edition, an animated film, a manga series, and a television anime series.

Media

FilmPretty Rhythm: All Star Selection: Prism Show Best Ten was announced in December 2013, and it was later released theaters nationwide in Japan on March 8, 2014. The film was animated by Tatsunoko Production and 10 Gauge, with Deko Akao as the scriptwriter. A Prism Stone compatible with the Pretty Rhythm arcade games was distributed as a limited edition theater gift. Prizmmy performed at certain screenings of the film.

The film is a summary of the top 10 performances from the Pretty Rhythm anime franchise, with characters from Pretty Rhythm: Aurora Dream, Pretty Rhythm: Dear My Future, and Pretty Rhythm: Rainbow Live appearing. Promotional material stated that a new character would be introduced in the film. Laala Manaka's identity was kept a secret until the film was released in theaters.

Game

Beginning April 17, 2014, the Pretty Rhythm: Rainbow Live Duo arcade game was retitled  with 84 new Prism Stones produced. It is the final version of the Pretty Rhythm arcade game series and ended services in July 2014.

Manga

A manga adaptation illustrated by Michiyo Kikuta began serializing in the April 2014 issue of Pucchigumi.

AnimePretty Rhythm: All Star Selection premiered on April 5, 2014 at TV Tokyo's 10 AM slot and ended on June 14, 2014. The series is a rebroadcast of select episodes from Pretty Rhythm: Aurora Dream, Pretty Rhythm: Dear My Future, and Pretty Rhythm: Rainbow Live. Each episode is preceded by a short animated segment where Aira Harune, Mia Ageha, and Naru Ayase give advice to aspiring Japanese idol and PriPara'' heroine Laala Manaka on ways to shine on stage.

References

External links
  at Takara Tomy 
 Pretty Rhythm: All Star Selection official anime website
 

Pretty Rhythm
2014 anime television series debuts
2014 anime films
Japanese children's animated sports television series
Anime television series based on video games
Arcade video games
Arcade-only video games
Music in anime and manga
Shogakukan manga
Shōjo manga
Sports anime and manga
Syn Sophia games
Takara Tomy franchises
Tatsunoko Production
TV Tokyo original programming
Japanese idols in anime and manga
Figure skating in anime and manga
Video games developed in Japan